The 1997 Italian Figure Skating Championships was held from December 12 through 15, 1996. Skaters competed in the disciplines of men's singles, ladies' singles, and ice dancing. The results were used to choose the teams to the 1997 World Championships, the 1997 European Championships, and the 1997 World Junior Championships.

Senior results

Men

Ladies

Ice dancing

External links
 results

Italian Figure Skating Championships
Italian Figure Skating Championships
Italian Figure Skating Championships
Figure Skating Championships
Figure Skating Championships
Italian Figure Skating Championships